Crookston railway station is a railway station in Crookston, a district of Glasgow, Scotland. The station is managed by ScotRail and lies on the Paisley Canal Line which was reopened by British Rail, 4 miles (7 km) west of Glasgow Central.

History 
The station was opened by the Glasgow and South Western Railway on 1 July 1885. It was temporarily closed due to the First World War on 1 January 1917 reopening in 1919. Following review of the finances of operations of railway services operated by Strathclyde Passenger Transport Executive, funding for the line was withdrawn resulting in the closure of the station on 10 January 1983.
The station reopened on 28 July 1990 at the same time as the Paisley Canal Line reopened by British Rail. The station buildings are now protected as a category B listed building.

Services 

On Sundays, an hourly service operates in each direction.

References

Notes

Sources 
 
 
 
 

Railway stations in Glasgow
SPT railway stations
Railway stations in Great Britain opened in 1885
Railway stations in Great Britain closed in 1917
Railway stations in Great Britain opened in 1919
Railway stations in Great Britain closed in 1983
Railway stations in Great Britain opened in 1990
Reopened railway stations in Great Britain
Railway stations served by ScotRail
Former Glasgow and South Western Railway stations
Category B listed buildings in Glasgow
Listed railway stations in Scotland
1885 establishments in Scotland